Bruno Sorić (16 May 1904 – 7 June 1942), was a Croatian rower who competed for Italy in the 1924 Summer Olympics. In 1924 he won the bronze medal as crew member of the Italian boat in the men's eight competition.

References

External links
Bruno Sorić's profile at databaseOlympics

1904 births
1942 deaths
Sportspeople from Zadar
Italian male rowers
Italian people of Croatian descent
Croatian male rowers
Olympic rowers of Italy
Rowers at the 1924 Summer Olympics
Olympic bronze medalists for Italy
Olympic medalists in rowing
Medalists at the 1924 Summer Olympics
European Rowing Championships medalists
Italian military personnel killed in World War II